John Frederick Winn  (24 March 1921 – 24 June 2015) was a soldier of the British Army who won both a Military Cross and a Silver Star in 1944 in Italy during the Second World War.

References 

1921 births
2015 deaths
British Army personnel of World War II
Recipients of the Military Cross
Foreign recipients of the Silver Star
People from Birkenhead
People educated at Wirral Grammar School for Boys
Loyal Regiment officers